William G. Bush IV (born February 1968) is an American politician. He is a Democratic member of the Delaware House of Representatives, representing district 29. Bush was elected in the general election on November 6, 2018, winning 58 percent of the vote over Republican candidate Robin Hayes. He earned his undergraduate degree at the University of Delaware and received a Juris Doctor degree from Widener University.

References

External links
Official page at the Delaware General Assembly
Campaign site
 

1968 births
Living people
Widener University School of Law alumni
Democratic Party members of the Delaware House of Representatives
21st-century American politicians